Sunyani Airport  has been reopened after undergoing extensive rehabilitation of both the runway and terminal building .The airport serves Sunyani, a town and  capital of Bono Region mid-western Ghana.

Airlines and destinations

References

External links

 
 

Airports in Ghana
Sunyani